Anochetus consultans is a species of ant in the subfamily Ponerinae. It can be found from Sri Lanka.

References

External links

 at antwiki.org
Animaldiversity.org
Itis.org

Ponerinae
Hymenoptera of Asia
Insects described in 1859